1099 Figneria, provisional designation , is an asteroid from the background population of the outer regions of the asteroid belt, approximately 26 kilometers in diameter. Discovered by Grigory Neujmin at Simeiz Observatory in 1928, the asteroid was later named after Russian revolutionary activist Vera Figner.

Discovery 

Figneria was discovered by Soviet astronomer Grigory Neujmin at the Simeiz Observatory on the Crimean peninsula on 13 September 1928. On the same night, it was independently discovered by German astronomer Max Wolf at the Heidelberg Observatory in southwest Germany. The Minor Planet Center, however, only acknowledges the first discoverer.

Orbit and classification 

Figneria is a non-family asteroid of the main belt's background population. It orbits the Sun in the outer main belt at a distance of 2.3–4.1 AU once every 5 years and 8 months (2,071 days). Its orbit has an eccentricity of 0.28 and an inclination of 12° with respect to the ecliptic.

Physical characteristics 

PanSTARRS photometric survey gave Figneria a spectral type of an L- and S-type asteroid, while it has been characterized as a K-type asteroid based on polarimetric observations. The asteroid is also an assumed carbonaceous C-type asteroid.

Rotation period 

In September 2007, a rotational lightcurve of Figneria was obtained by astronomer Julian Oey at the Kingsgrove and Leura Observatories in Australia. Lightcurve analysis gave a rotation period of 13.577 hours with a brightness variation of 0.16 magnitude. In January 2014, photometric observations at the Palomar Transient Factory in California gave a period of 13.583 hours and an amplitude of 0.15 magnitude.

Diameter and albedo 

According to the surveys carried out by the Infrared Astronomical Satellite IRAS, the Japanese Akari satellite and the NEOWISE mission of NASA's Wide-field Infrared Survey Explorer, Figneria measures between 23.309 and 29.39 kilometers in diameter and its surface has an albedo between 0.1415 and 0.225.

The Collaborative Asteroid Lightcurve Link derives an albedo of 0.1683 and a diameter of 29.55 kilometers based on an absolute magnitude of 10.2.

Naming 

This minor planet was named by the discoverer after Vera Figner (1852–1942), a Russian writer and revolutionary political activist. The official naming citation was published in the Planetenzirkular des Astronomischen Rechen-Institut.

Notes

References

External links 
 Asteroid Lightcurve Database (LCDB), query form (info )
 Dictionary of Minor Planet Names, Google books
 Asteroids and comets rotation curves, CdR – Observatoire de Genève, Raoul Behrend
 Discovery Circumstances: Numbered Minor Planets (1)-(5000) – Minor Planet Center
 
 

001099
Discoveries by Grigory Neujmin
Named minor planets
19280913